was a Japanese film director.

Born in Arasaka, Tokyo Prefecture, Gosha graduated from high school and served in the Imperial Navy during the Second World War. After earning a business degree at Meiji University, he joined Nippon television as a reporter in 1953. In 1957 he moved on to the newly founded Fuji Television and rose through the ranks as a producer and director. One of his television shows, the chambara Three Outlaw Samurai, so impressed the heads of the Shochiku film studio that he was offered the chance to adapt it as a feature film in 1964. Following this film's financial success, he directed a string of equally successful chambara productions through the end of the 1960s. His two most critical and popular successes of the period are Goyokin and Hitokiri (also known as Tenchu), both released in 1969 and both considered to be two of the finest examples of the chambara genre. In The Samurai Film, the first book-length study of the genre in English, film historian Alain Silver devoted an entire chapter to Gosha's work and noted that "Tenchu/Hitokiri may, with some justice, be cited as one of the most accomplished examples of the samurai genre since World War II."

During the 1970s Gosha abandoned pure chambara and turned his productive energies toward films in the yakuza genre but he still produced period sword films such as The Wolves (1971), Bandits vs. Samurai Squadron (1978), and Hunter in the Dark (1979). His films Three Outlaw Samurai and Sword of the Beast (1965) have been released by Criterion.

By the early 1980s, Gosha began making period films that featured prostitutes as protagonists that were renowned for their realism, violence, and overt sexuality. They were critically panned for those very reasons, but they were also all box office successes. In 1984 he was awarded the Japan Academy Prize for Director of the Year for The Geisha.

Gosha’s films have influenced directors including Chang Cheh, Takashi Miike, and Yoshiaki Kawajiri.

Filmography
 1964 Three Outlaw Samurai
 1965 Sword of the Beast
 1966 Cash Calls Hell 
 1966 The Secret of the Urn 
 1966 Samurai Wolf
 1967 Samurai Wolf II
 1969 Goyokin
 1969 Hitokiri (a.k.a. Tenchu)
 1971 The Wolves
 1974 Violent Streets
 1978 Bandits vs. Samurai Squadron
 1979 Hunter in the Dark
 1982 Onimasa
 1983 The Geisha
 1984 Fireflies in the North
 1985 Oar/Kai
 1985 Tracked/Usugesho
 1986 Death Shadows
 1986 The Yakuza Wives
 1987 Tokyo Bordello
 1988 Carmen 1945
 1989 226/Four Days of Snow and Blood
 1991 Kagero
 1992 The Oil-Hell Murder

References

External links
 A Director's Cuts: The Samurai Savvy Of Hideo Gosha at washingtonpost.com
 
 

1929 births
1992 deaths
People from Tokyo
Japanese film directors
Samurai film directors
Japan Academy Prize for Director of the Year winners